Helena Buczyńska (1894 in Shchigry, Kursk Governorate – 1957) was a Polish actress.

Selected filmography
 His Excellency, The Shop Assistant (1933)
 Granny Had No Worries (1935)
 Profesor Wilczur (1938)
 The Vagabonds (1939)
 The Three Hearts (1939)
 Irena do domu! (1955)

Bibliography
 Skaff, Sheila. The Law of the Looking Glass: Cinema in Poland, 1896-1939. Ohio University Press, 2008.

External links

1894 births
1957 deaths
People from Shchigry, Kursk Oblast
People from Shchigrovsky Uyezd
Polish film actresses
Polish stage actresses